The Siskins were a Royal Canadian Air Force (RCAF) aerobatic flying team that was established in 1929 at Camp Borden, Ontario. It was the air force's first official aerobatic team. Flying three Armstrong Whitworth Siskin biplanes, the Siskins quickly built a reputation for performing daring maneuvers. The Siskins flew more than 100 air shows over three years before being disbanded in 1932 when the Great Depression forced the RCAF to reduce operations.

Siskins' Squadron Leader E.A. McNab would later earn recognition as the first RCAF pilot to win the Distinguished Flying Cross during the Second World War.

References

 Dempsey, Daniel V. A Tradition of Excellence: Canada's Airshow Team Heritage. Victoria, BC: High Flight Enterprises, 2002. .
Milberry, Larry, ed. Sixty Years—The RCAF and CF Air Command 1924–1984. Toronto: Canav Books, 1984. .

Royal Canadian Air Force